Dwayne Earl Jiles (born November 23, 1961) is a former American football linebacker in the National Football League for the Philadelphia Eagles and the New York Giants.  He was born in Linden, Texas, played college football at Texas Tech and was drafted in the fifth round of the 1985 NFL Draft.

1961 births
Living people
People from Linden, Texas
American football linebackers
Texas Tech Red Raiders football players
Philadelphia Eagles players
New York Giants players